General Sir Herbert John Mogg,  (17 February 1913 – 28 October 2001) was a senior British Army officer who also held the NATO position of Deputy Supreme Allied Commander Europe (DSACEUR) and was "in his time, probably the British army's most popular general".

Army career
He was educated at St Michael's School, Victoria, B.C., Malvern College, and the Royal Military College, Sandhurst. After Malvern he took a Y-cadetship with 3rd Battalion, Coldstream Guards. After three years in the ranks he was selected for Sandhurst, where he gained the Sword of Honour in 1936, being commissioned into the 1st Battalion, Oxfordshire and Buckinghamshire Light Infantry, (43rd & 52nd) in August 1937.

Second World War
In 1939, he was posted to 5th Battalion, Oxfordshire & Buckinghamshire Light Infantry, a newly formed Territorial training unit, and served initially as Adjutant and later Second in Command. By 1943, Major Mogg was in Command of a Divisional Battle School at Margate, 61st Infantry Division, XI Corps, Home Forces. Mogg approached Major General Adrian Carton de Wiart, VC., and later Major General Brian Wainwright, Commanding Officers, 61st Infantry Division seeking an operational command. In the weeks before D-Day he was appointed Second in Command, 9th Battalion Durham Light Infantry, 151st Brigade.

On D-Day, 6 June 1944, 9th DLI landed on Gold Beach at Le Hamel, Asnelles. In the breakout from the Normandy beachhead, 9DLI supported by 4th/7th Dragoon Guards were ordered to attack the village of Lingevres, 14 June 1944, defended by the Panzer Lehr Division. John Mogg gave an account of his experiences of the battle, during which the Commanding Officer, Lt Col. Humphrey Woods, DSO, MC* was killed and Mogg assumed command.

"As we crossed the start line all hell let loose from our own side and what with Typhoons and the artillery barrage and the tanks all shooting up the enemy positions in the wood, you could have seen the ground literally dance in front of you. And trees were coming down and I thought to myself "Good Lord, nobody can ever live in that thing, we must be able to walk straight on to our objective"." 
"And so we crossed right on time, 10.15, across the start line, with Humphrey Woods on the left and me on the right and we went through the corn, and the Geordies were never very tall guys and the corn that year was extremely high. We advanced about halfway across the corn with still this barrage going on when you suddenly saw the odd Geordie dropping in the corn and you couldn’t quite make this out where it was coming from. But, in fact, it was machine-gun fire coming from the forward edge of the wood and quite a lot of Geordies were dropping in the corn as casualties all the way along."

"However we advanced...and I spoke to Humphrey Woods on my radio, and this is the last time I heard him, and he said "We are running into terrible trouble here on the left, all the ‘A’ Company officers are casualties. I am trying to get on with ‘B’ Company and I will try and see how it happens. If not, if we don’t make any ground, you go on, whatever you do go on to your side of the village and I will try and collect as many of our soldiers and then come round behind you, because it’s obviously going to be easier your side". And, in fact, he was right, it was easier our side and apart from a fair amount of hand to hand fighting of ‘C’ Company on the right we got into the woods."

“...There was a scene of utter destruction with the church in ruins and many of the buildings had collapsed and there was very heavy shelling from the far side of the village. I suddenly had a message to say that Humphrey Woods had been killed and I suddenly realized that meant that I was the senior officer in the place and that made me the Commanding Officer, which filled me with utter despair to start with but I realized I must do something about it."

"I remember my Gunner officer was up by the Church in his tank at the main crossroads and we made a plan for some Artillery Fires which I could call for quickly." "We had an ‘O’ group with the two Company Commanders, the Anti Tank Platoon Commander, Carrier Platoon Commander, the Gunner and the 4th/7th Sqn Leader. I allocated positions for the Coys. blocking both roads and then I sited the Anti tank guns."

Lingevres was taken and held against repeated German counter attacks until 9DLI and 4th/7th Dragoon Guards were relieved. The Battalion suffered casualties of 226 men and 22 Officers. Mogg was awarded DSO for his actions at Lingevres, presented in the field by Field Marshal Sir Bernard Montgomery,https://www.iwm.org.uk/collections/item/object/205416890 and became a distinguished commander of the 9th Battalion, Durham Light Infantry from the Invasion of Normandy to the defeat of Germany.

9DLI saw further action at the Falaise pocket, the crossing of the Albert Canal and at Gheel, Belgium. On 23 September, 151st Brigade was ordered to move north and east of Eindhoven with 231st Brigade to guard the right flank of Operation Market Garden. In November 1944 151st Brigade was disbanded and some units return to Britain. However 9DLI was reinforced and transferred to 7th Armoured Division, 131st Infantry Brigade, as a motorised battalion fighting at the Roer Triangle in January 1945 and the town of Ibbenbüren in March. 9DLI ended the war near Hamburg.

Post War
In 1945 he attended the Staff College, Camberley as a student. After two years in Germany as GSO1, 7th Armoured Division, he returned to the Staff College as a member of the Directing Staff. From 1950-52 he was Commanding Officer (CO) of the 10th Battalion, Parachute Regiment. In 1952 he became Chief Instructor at the School of Infantry at Warminster and from 1954 to 1956 was GSO1 at the Imperial Defence College. From 1958 he Commanded, 28th Commonwealth Infantry Brigade Group in the final stages of the Malayan Emergency, where he received the Meritorious Medal from the Sultan of Perak. On return he was appointed Director of Combat Development at the War Office and promoted to Major General.

"His next appointment, as Commandant of the Royal Military Academy Sandhurst, (1963-66), was an inspired choice. He loved the job, and it suited him down to the ground. He fired up the cadets with his own enthusiasm for the army, for soldiering in all its aspects, and for sport of many kinds, from cricket to horses. His appointment to the key command of First (British) Corps in Germany in 1966., pointed to his future advancement to the top of the army's tree,"

He was appointed General Officer Commanding Southern Command in 1968, General Officer Commanding, Army Strategic Command later that year and, finally, Adjutant-General to the Forces in 1970. He delivered the Kermit Roosevelt Lecture in April 1969 at Fort Leavenworth; an exchange programme with the US Army supported by the Kermit Roosevelt Fund. His lecture was suitably entitled; "Communication as a military art." He travelled extensively as Adjutant General, visiting British units overseas and reassuring Britain’s allies in the Middle East and elsewhere at the time of Britain's withdrawal from ‘East of Suez’; earning the sobriquet ‘Marco Polo” amongst his colleagues at the MOD.

His final appointment was with NATO at SHAPE, Mons as Deputy Supreme Allied Commander Europe, DSACEUR between 1973 and 1976. He was ADC General to the Queen from 1971 to 1974, Colonel Commandant of the Royal Green Jackets from 1965 to 1973, Commandant of the Army Air Corps from 1963 to 1974. and Honorary Colonel of the 10th Battalion, Parachute Regiment,(1973–78)

Mogg promoted many sports and adventure training within the army and was a president of a number army and veteran's associations. He served various charities mostly connected with the armed services or adventure training. He was respectively Chairman of Operation Drake Fellowship (now part of Fairbridge (charity), Operation Raleigh, President of the Army Cricket Association, Army Free Fall Parachute Association, Army Saddle Club, the British Horse Society, the Ex-Services Mental Welfare Society, The Normandy Veterans' Association and Chairman of The Army Benevolent Fund.

His interest in education was shown in his Chairmanship of the governors of the Royal Soldiers' Daughters School and Icknield School, Watlington. He was also a long serving governor of Bradfield College and his old school Malvern. In Detmold, Germany, a primary school for children whose parents are serving in the British Army was named after Sir John Mogg.

He was made Vice Lord Lieutenant of Oxfordshire in 1979.

Obituary
The Guardian and The Daily Telegraph obituaries summed up his personality and personal style:

"John Mogg's large frame was combined with an exceptionally genial, warm and sympathetic character, which appealed not only to soldiers of all ranks, but to people in every walk of life, whatever their nationality. In his time, he was probably the British army's most popular general, and finished his career in one of Nato's most influential posts, as deputy supreme allied commander (1973–76) at headquarters at Mons, in Belgium. Here, his sound common-sense and even temperament were valuable in balancing the direct approach, and sometimes abrasive personality, of the supreme commander, the US General Alexander Haig."

"John Mogg was a large man in every sense. Tall and heavily built, he always paid close attention to what someone was saying, ready with help and often a joke. His special gift was to appear to have the leisure to deal with any problem or request, although few people can have led such a busy life."

Family 
John Mogg was born near Comox, Vancouver Island, BC., the son of Captain Herbert Barrow Mogg, MC. (d. 1978), late Wiltshire Regiment & 4th Battalion Canadian Engineers, and Alice Mary Mogg, daughter of Lt Col John Fane Ballard, late DCLI, and Mary née Clerke Brown of Kingston Blount, Oxon. In 1939, he married Cecilia Margaret Molesworth (1914-2018), the daughter of Rev. John Hilton Molesworth (d.1921). Sir John and Lady Mogg had three sons.

References

|-
 

|-
 

|-
 

|-
 

|-
 

1913 births
2001 deaths
Canadian military personnel from British Columbia
People educated at Malvern College
Graduates of the Royal Military College, Sandhurst
British Army personnel of World War II
Coldstream Guards soldiers
Oxfordshire and Buckinghamshire Light Infantry officers
Durham Light Infantry officers
Knights Grand Cross of the Order of the Bath
Commanders of the Order of the British Empire
British Army generals
British Army personnel of the Malayan Emergency
Companions of the Distinguished Service Order
Commandants of Sandhurst
NATO military personnel
Graduates of the Staff College, Camberley
Academics of the Staff College, Camberley